Kyle Crutchmer (born May 5, 1993) is an American professional mixed martial artist, freestyle wrestler and graduated collegiate wrestler. He currently competes in the welterweight division of Bellator MMA. As a folkstyle wrestler, he was a two-time NCAA All-American and two-time Big 12 champion.

Early life 
Crutchmer was born and raised in Tulsa, Oklahoma. He is the son of Kevin and Tina Crutchmer and has three siblings, Brian, Justin and Kayla. He has a very strong relationship with his stepbrother Brian, whom he grew up with since he was a baby when his mother abandoned him. Since then, they attended high school and college together and even wrestled in the same team. In Union High School he was a two-sport varsity athlete, competing in football (since his sophomore year) and wrestling. He was a standout as a footballer, helping the Redskins to win three OSSAA team titles.

Wrestling career

High school 
Crutchmer started wrestling in sixth grade. While competing for Union High School, he won two 6A OSSAA individual titles, an NHSCA Junior National title and compiled an 198-30 record in folkstyle. He was also highly successful in freestyle, as he won the USAW Fargo Junior Nationals in 2012 and placed second and third at the FILA Age-group Nationals.

College 
Originally, Crutchmer was going to commit to the Sooners, but he ended up choosing the Cowboys as John Smith convinced him to and also to wrestle with his brother.

In his redshirt season (2012-2013), he compiled a 15-1 record in open tournaments at 174 pounds. As a freshman (2013-2014), he compiled a 20-8 record at three different weight classes throughout the season but did not compete at the Big 12's or the NCAA's. As a sophomore (2014-2015), he compiled a 21-7 record and won his first Big 12 title, helping the Cowboys to win the team title. At the NCAA's of that year, he went 4-2 to place fifth, earning All-American honors. As a junior (2015-2016), he compiled a 15-4 record, however, he suffered a season-ending injury at a dual match against the Sooners, leaving him unable to compete at the NCAA's or the Big 12's. As a senior (2016-2017), he compiled a 23-7 record and won his second Big 12 title at 174 pounds. At the NCAA championships, he compiled 5 wins and 2 losses to place seventh and earn All-American honors for the second time in his NCAA career.

Overall, Crutchmer was a two-time All-American and two-time Big 12 champion with a record of 79 victories and 26 defeats as a collegiate wrestler.

Freestyle

2013 
Fresh out of high school, Crutchmer made his senior freestyle debut at the 2013 US University National Championships in May. He won three straight matches but was subsequently thrown to the consolation bracket by Alex Meyer in a 29-point match. He was ultimately eliminated in his next bout by Gabe Dean, an eventual heavily accomplished wrestler.

2014 
While he was still a freshman in college, Crutchmer competed at the 2014 US National University Championships. He won his first five bouts by technical fall and the last one before the best-of-three finals by points. At the best-of-three, he defeated his opponent two times to none, winning the championship at 80 kilograms.

2017 
After a big break of three years, Crutchmer competed at the US Open. He won his first match by technical fall but subsequently lost to two-time NCAA champion Gabe Dean and got thrown to the consolation bracket. He bounced back and defeated four opponents before losing once again and proceeding to face Pat Downey at the fifth place match. He lost the match on points and placed sixth, qualifying for the WTT Challenge Tournament.

At the World Team Trials Challenge tournament, he was eliminated in the quarterfinals by Pat Downey and was thrown to the consolation bracket, where he defeated eventual Greco-Roman World Team Member Joe Rau and was subsequently downed by Richard Perry.

Mixed martial arts career

Early career 
Soon after he graduated, he started training at American Kickboxing Academy. A couple of months later, he made his professional MMA debut. He compiled an undefeated 4-0 record before signing with Bellator MMA.

Bellator MMA 
Crutchmer was scheduled to make his promotional debut against Antonio Jones on November 8, 2019 at Bellator 233. However, Jones withdrew from the bout and was replaced by Robert Gidron. He won the fight by unanimous decision.

In his next bout, Crutchmer faced Scott Futrell in a 175-pounds catchweight on February 21, 2020 at Bellator 239. He won the fight by submission in the first round.

Crutchmer faced Kemran Lachinov on October 15, 2020 at Bellator 249. He lost the bout by unanimous decision, marking the first loss of his mixed martial arts career.

Crutchmer faced undefeated Levan Chokheli at Bellator 260 on June 11, 2021. He won the bout via unanimous decision.

Crutchmer faced Oliver Enkamp on December 3, 2021 at Bellator 272. He won the bout via unanimous decision.

Crutchmer faced Michael Lombardo on April 15, 2022 at Bellator 277. He won the bout via unanimous decision.

Crutchmer faced Jaleel Willis on December 9, 2022, at Bellator 289. He lost the fight via unanimous decision.

Personal life 
In March 2020, Crutchmer and his girlfriend gave birth to their daughter.

Championships and accomplishments

Amateur wrestling

Folkstyle
National Collegiate Athletic Association
NCAA Division I All-American out of Oklahoma State University  (2015, 2017)
NCAA Division I 174 lb - 5th Place out of Oklahoma State University (2015)NCAA Division I 174 lb - 7th Place out of Oklahoma State University (2017)
Big 12 Conference
Big 12 174 lb Conference Championship out of Oklahoma State University  (2015, 2017)

Freestyle
United World Wrestling
2017 US Open Championships - 6th Place
2014 US University National Championships - 1st Place
2013 FILA Junior Nationals - 3rd place
2010 FILA Cadet Nationals - 2nd place
USA Wrestling
USA Wrestling Fargo All-American (2009, 2010, 2011, 2012)
2012 Fargo Junior Nationals - 1st place
2011 Fargo Junior Nationals - 4th place
2011 Southern Plains Junior Regionals - 1st place
2010 Fargo Junior Nationals - 6th place
2010 Southern Plains Junior Regionals - 1st place
2009 Fargo Cadet Nationals - 4th place

Mixed martial arts record
 

|-
|Loss
|align=center|9–2
|Jaleel Willis
|Decision (unanimous)
|Bellator 289
|
|align=center|3
|align=center|5:00
|Uncasville, Connecticut, United States
|
|-
|Win
|align=center|9–1
|Michael Lombardo
|Decision (unanimous)
|Bellator 277
|
|align=center|3
|align=center|5:00
|San Jose, California, United States
|
|-
|Win
|align=center|8–1
|Oliver Enkamp
|Decision (unanimous)
|Bellator 272
|
|align=center|3
|align=center|5:00
|Uncasville, Connecticut, United States
|
|-
|Win
|align=center|7–1
|Levan Chokheli
|Decision (unanimous)
|Bellator 260
|
|align=center|3
|align=center|5:00
|Uncasville, Connecticut, United States
|
|-
|Loss
|align=center|6–1
|Kemran Lachinov	
|Decision (unanimous)
|Bellator 249
|
|align=center|3
|align=center|5:00
|Uncasville, Connecticut, United States
|
|-
|Win
|align=center|6–0
|Scott Futrell
|Submission (anaconda choke)
|Bellator 239
|
|align=center|1
|align=center|2:58
|Thackerville, Oklahoma, United States
|
|-
|Win
|align=center|5–0
|Robert Gidron
|Decision (unanimous)
|Bellator 233
|
|align=center|3
|align=center|5:00
|Thackerville, Oklahoma, United States
|
|-
|Win
|align=center|4–0
|Josh Weston
|Decision (unanimous)
|XFL 356
|
|align=center|3
|align=center|5:00
|Tulsa, Oklahoma, United States
|
|-
|Win
|align=center|3–0
|Brandon Wright
|TKO (punches)
|XFL 352
|
|align=center|1
|align=center|3:59
|Tulsa, Oklahoma, United States
|
|-
|Win
|align=center|2–0
|Rocky Rosas
|Submission (arm-triangle choke)
|XFL: Rage on the River
|
|align=center|2
|align=center|1:08
|Tulsa, Oklahoma, United States
|
|-
|Win
|align=center|1–0
|Ronald Beasley
|Technical Submission (guillotine choke)
|XFL 348
|
|align=center|1
|align=center|1:23
|Miami, Oklahoma, United States
|

Freestyle record

! colspan="7"| Senior Freestyle Matches
|-
!  Res.
!  Record
!  Opponent
!  Score
!  Date
!  Event
!  Location
|-
! style=background:white colspan=7 |
|-
|Loss
|17-7
|align=left |  Richard Perry
|style="font-size:88%"|3-9
|style="font-size:88%" rowspan=3|June 9–10, 2017
|style="font-size:88%" rowspan=3|2017 US World Team Trials Challenge Tournament
|style="text-align:left;font-size:88%;" rowspan=3| Lincoln, Nebraska
|-
|Win
|17-6
|align=left |  Joe Rau
|style="font-size:88%"|5-2
|-
|Loss
|16-6
|align=left |  Pat Downey
|style="font-size:88%"|TF 1-14
|-
! style=background:white colspan=7 |
|-
|Loss
|16-5
|align=left |  Pat Downey
|style="font-size:88%"|3-7
|style="font-size:88%" rowspan=8|April 26–29, 2017
|style="font-size:88%" rowspan=8|2017 US Open Wrestling Championships
|style="text-align:left;font-size:88%;" rowspan=8| Las Vegas, Nevada
|-
|Loss
|16-4
|align=left |  Nick Heflin
|style="font-size:88%"|2-7
|-
|Win
|16-3
|align=left |  Timothy Dudley
|style="font-size:88%"|7-2
|-
|Win
|15-3
|align=left |  John Staudenmayer
|style="font-size:88%"|6-0
|-
|Win
|14-3
|align=left |  Vic Avery
|style="font-size:88%"|11-7
|-
|Win
|13-3
|align=left |  Xavier Montalvo
|style="font-size:88%"|TF 14-0
|-
|Loss
|12-3
|align=left |  Gabe Dean
|style="font-size:88%"|TF 4-15
|-
|Win
|12-2
|align=left| Paul Rademacher
|style="font-size:88%"|TF 10-0
|-
! style=background:white colspan=7 |
|-
|Win
|11-2
|align=left |  Tanner Weatherman
|style="font-size:88%"|6-3
|style="font-size:88%" rowspan=8|May 22–25, 2014
|style="font-size:88%" rowspan=8|2014 US University National Championships
|style="text-align:left;font-size:88%;" rowspan=8| Akron, Ohio
|-
|Win
|10-2
|align=left |  Tanner Weatherman
|style="font-size:88%"|6-3
|-
|Win
|9-2
|align=left |  Micah Barnes
|style="font-size:88%"|2-1
|-
|Win
|8-2
|align=left |  Tyler Rill
|style="font-size:88%"|TF 11-0
|-
|Win
|7-2
|align=left |  John Staudenmayer
|style="font-size:88%"|TF 13-2
|-
|Win
|6-2
|align=left |  Timothy Schaefer
|style="font-size:88%"|TF 11-0
|-
|Win
|5-2
|align=left |  Travis Edwards
|style="font-size:88%"|TF 12-1
|-
|Win
|4-2
|align=left| Carson Powell
|style="font-size:88%"|TF 10-0
|-
! style=background:white colspan=7 |
|-
|Loss
|3-2
|align=left |  Gabe Dean
|style="font-size:88%"|TF 1-11
|style="font-size:88%" rowspan=5|May 24–26, 2013
|style="font-size:88%" rowspan=5|2013 US University National Championships
|style="text-align:left;font-size:88%;" rowspan=5| Akron, Ohio
|-
|Loss
|3-1
|align=left |  Alex Meyer
|style="font-size:88%"|TF 8-21
|-
|Win
|3-0
|align=left |  Victor Terrell
|style="font-size:88%"|11-6
|-
|Win
|2-0
|align=left |  Blake Stauffer
|style="font-size:88%"|2-0
|-
|Win
|1-0
|align=left| Ryan Ward
|style="font-size:88%"|TF 10-0
|-

NCAA record 

! colspan="8"| NCAA Championships Matches
|-
!  Res.
!  Record
!  Opponent
!  Score
!  Date
!  Event
|-
! style=background:white colspan=6 |2017 NCAA Championships 7th at 174 lbs
|-
|Win
|9-4
|align=left|Jake Residori
|style="font-size:88%"|9-4
|style="font-size:88%" rowspan=7|March 17, 2017
|style="font-size:88%" rowspan=7|2017 NCAA Division I Wrestling Championships
|-
|Loss
|8-4
|align=left|Zac Brunson
|style="font-size:88%"|5-8
|-
|Win
|8-3
|align=left|Alex Meyer 
|style="font-size:88%"|13-10
|-
|Win
|7-3
|align=left|Christian Brucki 
|style="font-size:88%"|5-3
|-
|Win
|6-3
|align=left|Ethan Ramos
|style="font-size:88%"|5-3
|-
|Win
|5-3
|align=left|Jacob Morrissey
|style="font-size:88%"|MD 15-4
|-
|Loss
|4-3
|align=left|Jake Residori
|style="font-size:88%"|5-6
|-
! style=background:white colspan=6 |2015 NCAA Championships 5th at 174 lbs
|-
|Win
|4-2
|align=left|Michael Evans
|style="font-size:88%"|TB 2-1
|style="font-size:88%" rowspan=6|March 20, 2015
|style="font-size:88%" rowspan=6|2015 NCAA Division I Wrestling Championships
|-
|Loss
|3-2
|align=left|Logan Storley 
|style="font-size:88%"|TB 7-9
|-
|Loss
|3-1
|align=left|Tyler Wilps 
|style="font-size:88%"|SV-1 1-3
|-
|Win
|3-0
|align=left|Joe Latham
|style="font-size:88%"|5-2
|-
|Win
|2–0
|align=left|Blaise Butler
|style="font-size:88%"|5-2
|-
|Win
|1-0
|align=left|Jadaen Bernstein
|style="font-size:88%"|5-3
|-

Stats 

!  Season
!  Year
!  School
!  Rank
!  Weigh Class
!  Record
!  Win
!  Bonus
|-
|2017
|Senior
|rowspan=4|Oklahoma State University
|#11 (7th)
|rowspan=4|174
|23-7
|76.67%
|26.67%
|-
|2016
|Junior
|#11 (DNQ)
|15-4
|78.95%
|31.58%
|-
|2015
|Sophomore
|#9 (5th)
|21-7
|75.00%
|10.71%
|-
|2014
|Freshman
|#25 (DNQ)
|20-8
|71.43%
|21.43%
|-
|colspan=5 bgcolor="LIGHTGREY"|Career
|bgcolor="LIGHTGREY"|79-26
|bgcolor="LIGHTGREY"|75.24%
|bgcolor="LIGHTGREY"|21.90%

See also
 List of current Bellator fighters
 List of male mixed martial artists

References

External links
 

Living people
1994 births
American male mixed martial artists
Mixed martial artists from Oklahoma
Oklahoma State Cowboys wrestlers
People from Tulsa, Oklahoma
Welterweight mixed martial artists
Mixed martial artists utilizing collegiate wrestling
Mixed martial artists utilizing freestyle wrestling
American male sport wrestlers
Amateur wrestlers